Kurukshetra Junction railway station is a junction station at the junction of Delhi–Kalka line and Kurukshetra–Jind branch line. It is located in the Indian state of Haryana. It serves Kurukshetra and Thanesar city.

Signalling system: The station is equipped with Standard III interlocking System with Multiple aspect Color light Signals and mechanical points. Operation of signaling system is with levers at the cabins at both ends.

Trains 
Major trains at Kurukshetra are-
 Kalka Mail – Kalka to Howrah
 Himachal Express – Delhi to Amb Andaura
 New Delhi DEMU – New Delhi to Kurukshetra
 Ajmer–Chandigarh Garib Rath Express
 Jhelum Express – Jammu to Pune
 Allahabad–Chandigarh Unchahar Express
 Indore–Jammu Malwa Express
 New Delhi–Kalka Shatabdi Express
 Una Jan Shatabdi Express
 Shan-e-Punjab Express – New Delhi to Amritsar
 Sachkhand Express – Nanded To Amritsar
 Himalayan Queen Express – Kalka to Delhi Sarai Rohilla
 Amritsar–Jaynagar Saryu Yamuna Express

References 

Railway junction stations in Haryana
Railway stations in Kurukshetra district
Delhi railway division